John Sheppey ( – 19 October 1360) was an English administrator and bishop. He served as treasurer from 1356 to 1360. Little is known of his family and background. A Benedictine, he was ordained deacon in 1318, and later studied at Oxford. Later he became involved in royal government, and was made bishop of Rochester on 22 October 1352. He was consecrated on 10 March 1353. He died on 19 October 1360, and was buried in Rochester Cathedral at the altar of St John the Baptist. As his will shows, he was a friend of his predecessor in the treasury, William Edington.

Sheppey is today remembered mostly for his sermons, many of which still survive.

Citations

References

External links
 
 

1360 deaths
Lord High Treasurers of England
Bishops of Rochester
14th-century English Roman Catholic bishops
Year of birth uncertain
English Benedictines
1300 births